Ravindu Dhirajlal Shah (born 28 August 1972) is a former Kenyan cricketer. He is a right-handed batman. He was part of Kenya's 1999, 2003 and 2007 World Cup squads.

Domestic career
He played 56 One-day Internationals for Kenya and also appeared in first-class and List A cricket for Kenya. Ravindu went to Visa Oshwal Primary School in Parklands, Nairobi and was on the school's cricket team.

International career
He made his ODI debut with 52 against Bangladesh at Hyderabad in the Coca-Cola Triangular Series in 1998. He scored his maiden ODI hundred, 113, against Scotland in Mombasa in 2007. He also made 71 against New Zealand in the 2007 World Cup.

In Kenya's 2003 ICC Cricket World Cup campaign, he scored 50s against South Africa and Canada in the group stages. He also scored 34 and 46 in the Super Six and semi-final matches respectively; both against India.

References

1972 births
Living people
Cricketers from Nairobi
Kenyan cricketers
Kenya One Day International cricketers
Cricketers at the 1998 Commonwealth Games
Kenyan people of Indian descent
Cricketers at the 1999 Cricket World Cup
Cricketers at the 2003 Cricket World Cup
Kenyan Jains
Gujarati people
Kenyan people of Gujarati descent
Commonwealth Games competitors for Kenya